44 Central Avenue (also known as J.R. Peter's and Sons) is a historic commercial building located in the Washington Avenue neighborhood of Albany, Albany County, New York.

Description and history 
It was built sometime between June 23, 1813 and 1817 at a prominent intersection known as Robinson's Point, and is a three-story, load bearing brick wedge-shaped building with the bricks on the exterior laid in a Flemish bond pattern. It sits on an uncoursed rubble foundation and has a full basement. The building housed a grain and feed storage and sales company until 1941. In 1983 the building underwent major rehabilitations, and is currently occupied by the Preservation League of New York State.

It was listed on the National Register of Historic Places on February 14, 2014.

References

Commercial buildings on the National Register of Historic Places in New York (state)
Commercial buildings completed in 1817
Buildings and structures in Albany, New York
National Register of Historic Places in Albany, New York
Early Republic architecture in the United States